The Women's short race at the 2004 IAAF World Cross Country Championships was held at the Ossegem Park in Brussels, Belgium, on March 21, 2004.  Reports of the event were given in The New York Times, and for the IAAF.

Complete results for individuals, for teams, medallists, and the results of British athletes who took part were published.

Race results

Women's short race (4 km)

Individual

Teams

Note: Athletes in parentheses did not score for the team result

Participation
According to an unofficial count, 91 athletes from 29 countries participated in the Women's short race.

 (3)
 (6)
 (1)
 (6)
 (1)
 (1)
 (2)
 (6)
 (5)
 (1)
 (3)
 (3)
 (6)
 (5)
 (1)
 (4)
 (1)
 (6)
 (1)
 (1)
 (6)
 (5)
 (1)
 (2)
 (1)
 (1)
 (5)
 (6)
 (1)

See also
 2004 IAAF World Cross Country Championships – Senior men's race
 2004 IAAF World Cross Country Championships – Men's short race
 2004 IAAF World Cross Country Championships – Junior men's race
 2004 IAAF World Cross Country Championships – Senior women's race
 2004 IAAF World Cross Country Championships – Junior women's race

References

Women's short race at the IAAF World Cross Country Championships
IAAF World Cross Country Championships
2004 in women's athletics